A-kinase anchor protein 2 is an enzyme that in humans is encoded by the AKAP2 gene.

Interactions
AKAP2 has been shown to interact with PRKAR2A.

References

External links

Further reading

A-kinase-anchoring proteins